Baker (also Romanized as Bakr) is a village in Kuhestan Rural District, Rostaq District, Darab County, Fars Province, Iran. At the 2006 census, its population was 224, in 67 families.

References 

Populated places in Darab County